Pidgin Hawaiian (or Hawaii Plantation Pidgin) is a pidgin spoken in Hawaii, which draws most of its vocabulary from the Hawaiian language and could have been influenced by other pidgins of the Pacific region, such as Maritime Polynesian Pidgin. Emerging in the mid-nineteenth century, it was spoken mainly by immigrants to Hawaii, and mostly died out in the early twentieth century, but is still spoken in some communities, especially on the Big Island. Like all pidgins, Pidgin Hawaiian was a fairly rudimentary language, used for immediate communicative purposes by people of diverse language backgrounds, but who were mainly from Southeast Asian countries such as the Philippines and Indonesia. As Hawaiian was the main language of the islands in the nineteenth century, most words came from this Polynesian language, though many others contributed to its formation. In the 1890s and afterwards, the increased spread of English favoured the use of an English-based pidgin instead, which, once nativized as the first language of children, developed into a creole which today is misleadingly called Hawaiian Pidgin. This variety has also been influenced by Pidgin Hawaiian; for example in its use of the grammatical marker pau.

Henry kokoe pau paina, wau hele on (Pidgin Hawaiian)

'After Henry had eaten dinner, I went.'

Jesus pau teach all dis kine story. (Hawaiian Creole)

'Jesus finished teaching all these kinds of stories.'

See also
Maritime Polynesian Pidgin

Footnotes

References

Hawaiian language
Hawaiian